Apax Global Alpha is a large British investment trust focused on private equity investments. Established in 2015, the company is a constituent of the FTSE 250 Index, an index of the larger companies on the London Stock Exchange.

The chairman is Tim Breedon CBE. The fund is managed by Apax Guernsey Managers. The company was adversely affected by a fall in net asset value in the first half of 2022 but remains in the FTSE 250 Index.

References

External links
 Official site

Investment trusts of the United Kingdom
Companies listed on the London Stock Exchange